"Rain" is a rock song by English band The Cult, which on release in 1985 reached number 17 in the United Kingdom's Singles Chart. It was the second single from the band's second long-player, Love (1985).

Development
The song was provisionally titled "Sad Rain" during its writing and recording stages, the lyrics being inspired the vocalist/frontman Ian Astbury's interest at that time in Northern Native American culture, and a rain dance of the Arizonan Hopi people.

Performance history
Despite the song's popularity with the band's audience, and it being one of its more commercially successful single releases, after performing it on 24 November 1989 at Wembley Arena Astbury asked the crowd: "So you like that one?", and after it cheered in response, he responded with "Well, personally I don't but there you are..." although as he laughed when saying this, he may not have been serious.

Alternative versions
An extended remix was recorded by the band entitled "(Here Comes The) Rain".

Cover art
There were several variations of the cover artwork used throughout the world. Some versions used silver lettering, others used white, while others had a silhouette effect on the cover. 
In Japan, an alternative picture cover was used, with trio of photographs of the band: two onstage colour photos, and on the back one promotional black-and-white photo. This version was issued as both a white label promotional record, also with picture labels.

Track listing
Vinyl 7"
A Side : "Rain"B Side : "Little Face"

Vinyl 12"
A Side: "Rain", "Little Face"  B Side: "(Here Comes The) Rain"

Cover versions
German gothic rock/gothic metal band Love Like Blood recorded a cover of "Rain" on their 2001 album "Chronology Of A Love-Affair"
Italian gothic metal band Theatres des Vampires performed a cover version of Rain on their 2008 album, Anima Noir.
Italian heavy metal band Rain recorded a cover of Rain on their 2008 album, "Dad is Dead".
Japanese experimental/drone/stoner band Boris, together with Ian Astbury, recorded a cover version of "Rain" on their 2010 collaborative EP, "BXI"
Canada-based groove metallists City of Fire recorded a cover of "Rain" on their self-titled 2010 album.
The album "Metal Addiction" contains a cover by Sun Eats Hours.
Canadian musician Philip André and Polish singer Palon released a cover of "Rain" in 2014.
American stoner/industrial/groove metal band City of Fire recorded a cover of "Rain" on their self-titled 2011 album.
German gothic metal band ASP recorded a cover of "Rain" in their 2009 single "Wer sonst? / Im Märchenland".

Use in other media
 The original version was used in the soundtrack to the video game Grand Theft Auto V.
 The remix and original versions of the song were used in the soundtrack of cinema film Demoni 2.

References

The Cult songs
1985 singles
Songs written by Ian Astbury
Songs written by Billy Duffy
1985 songs
Beggars Banquet Records singles